Major General LeRoy Springs Lyon (15 October 1866 – 23 February 1920) was a United States Army officer.

Early life 
LeRoy Lyon was born to John Lyon and Margaret Springs Lyon on 15 October 1866, in Petersburg, Virginia. LeRoy Lyon attended and graduated from Richmond College with a Bachelor of Arts in 1886. Lyon then went on to attend the U.S. Military Academy, from which he graduated seventh out of a class of sixty-five in 1891. Among his classmates were several men who would, like Lyon himself, become general officers in the future, such as Andrew Hero Jr., James F. McIndoe, John W. Heavey, John J. Bradley, Edwin B. Winans, John L. Hines, and Hanson E. Ely.

Military career 
Lyon was commissioned into the 7th Cavalry as a Second Lieutenant upon his graduation from the U.S. Military Academy in 1891. Much of his career with the 7th Cavalry would take place along the Mexican border as the regiment pursued renegade Apache Indians.

Spanish–American War 
In 1898, Lyon graduated from the Coast Artillery School at Fort Monroe, Virginia, and was immediately appointed aide to General Royal T. Frank at Chickamauga Park, Anniston and Department of the Gulf headquarters. Lyon served as Gen. Frank's aide during much of the Spanish–American War until 1899. In 1899, Lyon was transferred to the 2nd Artillery Regiment and saw service in Cuba until 1900.

In 1903, after graduating from the School of Submarine Defense at Fort Totten, New York, Lyon was appointed District Artillery Engineer at Fort Barrancas, Florida, position which he held until 1906. From 1906 to 1907, Lyon served in the Philippine–American War against the Moros.

Lyon served in the Panama Canal Zone from 1916–1917, where he was promoted to colonel in May 1915 before returning to the United States to command Camp Bowie, Texas, until May of the same year. Lyon was promoted to brigadier general in August 1917 and was given command of the 65th Field Artillery Brigade at Camp Kearny, California, in August 1917 following the U.S. entry into the First World War.

First World War 
In May 1918, Lyon was promoted once more, this time to major general, and given command of the 31st Infantry Division. Lyon arrived in France with the 31st Infantry Division on September 29 and participated in the Meuse–Argonne offensive later that year. In November 1918, Lyon was given command of the 90th Infantry Division until December of the same year.

Inter-war period 
After the First World War, Lyon returned to the United States on 13 May 1919 and reverted to his pre-war rank of colonel in the Field Artillery, commanding the Field Artillery Basic School at Camp Taylor, Kentucky, where he died on 23 February 1920.

Personal life and death 
LeRoy Springs Lyon married Harriet Amsden on 1 December 1903. He died at Camp Taylor and was buried at the Arlington National Cemetery. He was posthumously awarded the Distinguished Service Medal for his excellent leadership of the 65th Field Artillery Brigade and the 31st Infantry Division. The citation for the medal reads:

References

Bibliography 
Chandler, Melbourne C. Of Garryowen In Glory: The History of the 7th U.S. Cavalry, (Annandale, VA: The Turnpike Press, 1960), pp. 84–107 
Cullum, George Washington. Biographical Register of the Officers and Graduates of the U.S. Military Academy at West Point, New York Since its Establishment in 1802: Supplement, Volume VI-A, (Saginaw, MI: Seemann & Peters, 1920), pp. 575–576
Davis, Henry Blaine Jr. Generals in Khaki, (Raleigh, NC: Pentland Press, 1998), pp. 236 
"MG LeRoy Springs Lyon", LeRoy Springs Lyon, Find A Grave, Accessed 1 July 2019, MG LeRoy Springs Lyon (1866-1920) - Find A Grave Memorial
Who Was Who in American History - The Military (Chicago, IL: Marquis Who's Who, Inc., 1975) pp. 356
Wythe, George. A History of the 90th Infantry Division, (New York, NY: 90th Division Association, 1920) 

United States Military Academy alumni
American military personnel of the Spanish–American War
United States Army generals of World War I
United States Army generals
1866 births
1920 deaths
United States Army Cavalry Branch personnel
University of Richmond alumni
American military personnel of the Philippine–American War
People from Petersburg, Virginia
Military personnel from Virginia